Joan Lowery Nixon (February 3, 1927 – June 28, 2003) was an American journalist and author, specializing in historical fiction and mysteries for children and young adults.

Biography
Joan Lowery was born on February 3, 1927, in Los Angeles, California. In 1947, she received a degree in Journalism from the University of Southern California. At USC, she met her husband, Hershell, a United States Navy officer and a geologist. At USC she was a member of Kappa Delta sorority. She taught school in Los Angeles before starting her family.  In 1964 her first book for children, The Mystery of Hurricane Castle, was published. Her son, Joe Nixon, is a Houston lawyer, who was from 1995 to 2007 a Republican member of the Texas House of Representatives from District 133 in Houston. Nixon, her husband, and their children lived in Corpus Christi, Texas, before finally settling in the Memorial and Tanglewood area of Houston, Texas. She died of pancreatic cancer in Houston on June 28, 2003.

Work
Nixon wrote more than 140 books, including The Kidnapping of Christina Lattimore (1979). She  co-authored several science books with her geologist husband Hershell Nixon.

Nixon was the only author to win four Edgar Allan Poe Awards from the Mystery Writers of America, and had five additional nominations. She won the California Young Reader Medal of the California Library Association twice. She also won the Western Writers of America's Golden Spur Award twice, and received the Texas Institute of Letters Award. Her book Land of Hope is used in some middle schools.

Her novel The Other Side of Dark was made into the 1995 TV movie Awake To Danger, starring Tori Spelling and Michael Gross.

References

External links

 Short autobiography at Scholastic Teachers
 Joan Lowery Nixon Collection at University of Minnesota CLRC, with biographical sketch
 

1927 births
2003 deaths
American children's writers
American women journalists
American mystery writers
Edgar Award winners
Deaths from pancreatic cancer
Writers from Houston
Writers from Los Angeles
USC Annenberg School for Communication and Journalism alumni
Deaths from cancer in Texas
American women novelists
20th-century American novelists
20th-century American women writers
Women mystery writers
Journalists from Texas
Novelists from Texas
20th-century American non-fiction writers
20th-century American journalists
21st-century American women